Woodhead Dam is a dam on Table Mountain, Western Cape, South Africa. It was built in 1897 and supplies water to Cape Town. The dam, which was the first large masonry dam in South Africa, was designated as an International Historic Civil Engineering Landmark by the American Society of Civil Engineers in 2008.

History

In 1870, the growth of Cape Town led to shortages of drinking water. It was decided to build a reservoir on Table Mountain to provide water to the city.  Scottish hydraulic engineer Thomas Stewart was engaged to design and build the reservoir.

The Woodhead Tunnel was built between 1888 and 1891. It was used to divert the Disa Stream, a tributary of the Hout Bay River, westward to provide water for the reservoir.

An aerial cableway was constructed to transport men and materials to the construction site. The dam was constructed between 1894 and 1897. This dam was followed by four others in the area. The Hely-Hutchinson Dam and reservoir were built by 1904 just upstream of the Woodhead reservoir. The Alexandra Dam and Victoria Dam were built on the original Disa Stream by 1903. The last of the five dams was the De Villiers Dam in 1907. This was built downstream of the Alexandra and Victoria Dams. Today, these five dams supply around 0.4% of the water for Cape Town.

Design
It has a free overspill spillway with a capacity of 20 m3/s (706 ft3/s).

See also
List of reservoirs and dams in South Africa

References 

Dams in South Africa
Historic Civil Engineering Landmarks
Buildings and structures in Cape Town
Dams completed in 1897
Masonry dams
19th-century architecture in South Africa